The 2018 LPGA Tour is a series of professional golf tournaments for elite female golfers from around the world. The season begins in Bahamas on January 25 and ends on November 18 at the Tiburón Golf Club in Naples, Florida. The tournaments are sanctioned by the United States-based Ladies Professional Golf Association (LPGA).

Schedule and results
The number in parentheses after each winners' name is the player's total number of wins in official money individual events on the LPGA Tour, including that event. Tournament and winner names in bold indicate LPGA majors.

^ ANA Inspiration finished on Monday April 2 due to darkness.

Statistical information

Wins by player

Wins by nation

Statistics leaders

Money list leaders

Source and complete list: LPGA official website.

Scoring average

Source and complete list: LPGA official website.

Awards

See also
2018 Ladies European Tour
2018 Symetra Tour

References

LPGA Tour seasons
LPGA Tour